Quercus tarahumara (also called Tarahumara oak) is a species of tree in the beech family. It grows in the Sierra Madre Occidental in the Mexican States of Chihuahua, Sonora, Durango, and Sinaloa. Some of the populations lie within the territory occupied by the Tarahumara people, after whom the species is named. It is placed in Quercus section Lobatae.

Description
Quercus tarahumara is a tree up to 10 meters (33 feet) tall. The leaves are rather large for the genus, up to 30 centimeters (1 ft) across, with the stiffness of cardboard, green on top but tan on the underside. It is sometimes called the "handbasin oak" because its size and shape suggest a bathroom sink.

Range and habitat
Quercus tarahumara is found on the western slopes of the northern Sierra Madre Occidental in northwestern Mexico. Its range includes the Sierra of southeastern Sonora, southwestern Chihuahua, northeastern Sinaloa, and northwestern Durango states, along with several sky island ranges lying west of the main mass of the Sierra in Sonora and Chihuahua.

Quercus tarahumara is found in forest and woodland between 1,020 and 2,200 meters elevation. It occurs on igneous and presumably acid substrate, on reddish or pale gray epithermically or hydrothermically altered substrate, and on benches of white ashy soil. It typically grows in 'islands' in oak forests and woodlands, in association with Q. albocincta, Q. arizonica, Q. chihuahuensis, Q. jonesii, Q. hypoleucoides, Q. mcvaughii, Q. oblongifolia, Q. toumeyi, and Q. viminea.

Conservation and threats
The population of Quercus tarahumara has been little studied. There is no evidence of population decline, and the species' conservation status is assessed as Least Concern.

The oaks of the Sierra Madre Occidental are extensively logged for timber and pulp. There are populations of Quercus tarahumara in protected areas, including Cascada de Basaseachi National Park, Papigochic Flora and Fauna Protection Area, and Tutuaca Flora and Fauna Protection Area.

References

External links

tarahumara
Flora of the Sierra Madre Occidental
Endemic oaks of Mexico
Trees of Chihuahua (state)
Trees of Sonora
Trees of Durango
Trees of Sinaloa
Plants described in 1995